The Best Christmas Pageant Ever (titled The Worst Kids in the World in Australia, New Zealand and the UK) is a children's novel written by Barbara Robinson in 1971. It tells the story of six misfit children who volunteer to star in their town's Sunday school Christmas pageant, and end up teaching the town the true meaning of Christmas.

Story 
The book is narrated in first person perspective by the (unnamed) daughter of the pageant's director.

The six Herdman children - Imogene, Ralph, Claude, Leroy, Ollie, and Gladys - are juvenile delinquents notorious for their rowdy misfit behavior, including cigar smoking, cussing, drinking jug wine, and shoplifting. They have never been disciplined because their father abandoned them when they were babies and their mother is always working multiple shifts to make ends meet. Despite their poor performance, the Herdmans steadily pass through elementary school (since holding any one of them back would mean having two or more of them in the same grade).

They go to Sunday school for the first time after being told that the church offers snacks. The narrator's mother is flabbergasted when they all volunteer for the lead roles in the Christmas pageant: Mary (Imogene), Joseph (Ralph), the Three Wise Men (Claude, Ollie, and Leroy), and the Angel of the Lord (Gladys), the last of whom likens her role to a character from Amazing Comics. Since they've bullied all the usual cast members into remaining silent during the call for volunteers, the director has no choice but to cast them.

Having never heard the Christmas story before, the Herdmans take an uncharacteristic interest, through which the narrator is surprised to find herself, and her parents, thinking more seriously about the story's harsher aspects: e.g., that the innkeeper forced a pregnant woman and her baby to sleep in a barn, and the Holy Family were on the run from King Herod, who wanted the baby Jesus killed.

Everyone in town is expecting the Christmas pageant to be a disaster, but the Herdmans' unconventional performances actually make the whole show much more realistic and moving: instead of walking on and off stage like actors, the Herdmans are a little uncertain about where to go and what to do, as the real-life Holy Family and Wise Men must have been; instead of laying the doll representing Jesus in the manger, Imogene insists on holding it, as if it is really her child; the Wise Men choose to bring the baby Jesus a ham from the Herdmans' own gift basket instead of the "crummy" frankincense and myrrh from the story; the shepherds are sufficiently terrified of Gladys to look authentically awed by her announcement of Jesus's birth; and during the final scene, the narrator looks over from the choir and is dumbstruck to see Imogene weeping softly while hugging the "baby".  By common agreement, it is the best Christmas pageant the town has ever had.

Literary influences 
In its amiable combination of farce and spirituality, the story appears to be a modern-day reimagining of the medieval Second Shepherds' Play, the surname "Herdman" being a thinly disguised synonym of "Shepherd."

Publication and reception 
Robinson first published the story in McCall's magazine before it was adapted into a book, which sold over 800,000 copies.

Stage and screen adaptations
The book was adapted by Robinson into a play which was first performed on November 26, 1982, by the Seattle Children's Theatre. 

The Best Christmas Pageant Ever is a play performed annually for over 20 years by Stage One, a children's theater in Louisville, KY.  Other theaters that have performed the play are the Public Theatre of Kentucky in Bowling Green, KY, and The Communication Department of Mississippi College in Clinton, MS. The book was adapted into a television movie on ABC in 1983, starring Loretta Swit and a then-unknown Fairuza Balk. Robinson also wrote this adaptation's teleplay.

First Stage in Milwaukee has presented the show nine times since 1990. In 2018, they produced the musical version.

The Herdmans were featured in two sequels, The Best Halloween Ever! and The Best School Year Ever.

In November 2016, the Children's Theatre of Charlotte in Charlotte, NC, premiered The Best Christmas Pageant Ever: The Musical written by Jahnna Beecham and Malcolm Hillgartener and featuring a cast of both student and professional adult actors. The musical had the highest ticket sales of any show in the theater's history, causing CTC to remount the show in the 2017 season.

References

1971 American novels
American children's novels
Christmas novels
Harper & Row books
Christmas children's books
American novels adapted into films
1971 children's books
American novels adapted into plays
American novels adapted into television shows